David Buchanan may refer to:.
 David Buchanan (baseball) (born 1989), American professional baseball pitcher
 David Buchanan (cricketer) (1830–1900), spin bowler for pre-first-class Warwickshire and the Gentlemen
 David Buchanan (footballer, born 1962), English professional footballer
 David Buchanan (footballer, born 1986), professional footballer
 David Buchanan (musician), American bass guitarist with Yankee Grey
 David Buchanan (One Life to Live), a fictional character from the soap opera One Life to Live
 David Buchanan (politician) (1823–1890), member of the New South Wales Legislative Assembly, and later the Council
 David Buchanan (writer) (1595?–1652?), Scottish writer, author of De Scriptoribus Scotis and relative of historian George Buchanan
 David M. Buchanan (1862–?), United States Navy sailor and recipient of the Medal of Honor

See also
Dave Buchanan (disambiguation)